Thuso Phala (born 27 May 1986 in Soweto, Gauteng) is a retired South African football midfielder. He is the inventor of Thuso Phala dance moves that are becoming popular to South African soccer fans and dancers at large, the moves he makes after he scores a goal.

Phala was featured in a BBC documentary in 2004 entitled 'Football and Freedom' which followed the paths of two 13-year-old South Africans aiming to become professional footballers.

International career
Since making his debut for the South Africa national football team in 2010, Phala has appeared at both the 2013 and 2015 Africa Cup of Nations. He scored Bafana Bafana's opening goal of the 2015 tournament in a 3–1 loss to Algeria.

International goals

References

External links

1986 births
Living people
South African soccer players
Association football midfielders
Kaizer Chiefs F.C. players
Platinum Stars F.C. players
Mamelodi Sundowns F.C. players
SuperSport United F.C. players
Black Leopards F.C. players
Sportspeople from Soweto
South Africa international soccer players
2013 Africa Cup of Nations players
2015 Africa Cup of Nations players